Seven Barrows is a Bronze Age bowl barrow cemetery,  of which are designated a biological Site of Special Scientific Interest, at Upper Lambourn in the civil parish of Lambourn in the English county of Berkshire. It is managed by the Berkshire, Buckinghamshire and Oxfordshire Wildlife Trust and it is a Scheduled Monument.

The area is an unimproved chalk grassland with a rich flora and over 100 species of herbs have been recorded. It is also very rich in insects, especially butterflies, including small blue, brown argus, chalkhill blue, dark green fritillary and the scarce marsh fritillary.

References

 

Berkshire, Buckinghamshire and Oxfordshire Wildlife Trust
Barrows in the United Kingdom
History of Berkshire
Sites of Special Scientific Interest in Berkshire
West Berkshire District
Archaeological sites in Berkshire
Bronze Age sites in Berkshire
Scheduled monuments in Berkshire
Lambourn